The European Wheelchair Basketball Championship, is the main wheelchair basketball competition contested biennially by national teams governed by IWBF Europe, the European zone within the International Wheelchair Basketball Federation. The European Championship is also a qualifying tournament for the IWBF Wheelchair Basketball World Championships and the Paralympic Games.

Establish
The first European Championship for men was held in 1970. The first European Championship for women was held in 1974.

Summary

Men

https://www.the-sports.org/basketball-2021-men-s-wheelchair-european-championships-epr113771.html

Women

https://www.the-sports.org/basketball-2021-women-s-wheelchair-european-championships-epr113775.html

Medals (1970-2021)

Men's

Women's

Divisions

Division B

Men's Division B

Women's Division B

Division C

Men's Division C

Women's Division C
Up to 2022 Women's only 2 Division.

Youth

U22 Men's
https://hosted.wh.geniussports.com/IWBF/en/competition/19930/schedule

https://www.the-sports.org/basketball-2021-men-s-u-22-european-wheelchair-championships-epr113767.html

https://www.the-sports.org/basketball-2018-men-s-u-22-european-wheelchair-championships-epr90674.html

U24 Women's
https://hosted.wh.geniussports.com/IWBF/en/competition/20840/schedule

3on3 Basketball
From 2021.

Clubs
 European Clubs Wheelchair Basketball Championship (Mixed of Men and Women)
Eurocup 1: IWBF Champions League - From 1975
Eurocup 2: André Vergauwen Cup - From 1988
Eurocup 3: Willi Brinkmann Cup - From 1997
Eurocup 4: IWBF Challenge Cup - From 2009

Medals (1975-2022)
46+38+24+11=119

See also
Wheelchair basketball at the Summer Paralympics
Wheelchair Basketball World Championship
IWBF U23 World Wheelchair Basketball Championship
2011 Women's U25 Wheelchair Basketball World Championship
2015 Women's U25 Wheelchair Basketball World Championship
2019 Women's U25 Wheelchair Basketball World Championship
IWBF Champions League
André Vergauwen Cup
Willi Brinkmann Cup
IWBF Challenge Cup
Kitakyushu Champions Cup
Wheelchair basketball at the Asian Para Games
Africa Wheelchair Basketball Championship
Arab Wheelchair Basketball Championship

Links
https://hosted.wh.geniussports.com/IWBF/en/competition/19930/schedule

https://hosted.wh.geniussports.com/IWBF/en/competition/20840/schedule

https://hosted.wh.geniussports.com/IWBF/en/competition/18810/schedule

https://hosted.wh.geniussports.com/IWBF/en/competition/18811/schedule

https://www.the-sports.org/basketball-2021-men-s-u-22-european-wheelchair-championships-epr113767.html

https://www.the-sports.org/basketball-2018-men-s-u-22-european-wheelchair-championships-epr90674.html

https://www.the-sports.org/basketball-2019-men-s-wheelchair-european-championships-division-c-epr96254.html

https://www.the-sports.org/basketball-2018-men-s-wheelchair-european-championships-division-b-epr87949.html

https://fr.wikipedia.org/wiki/Championnats_d%27Europe_de_basket-ball_en_fauteuil_roulant?tableofcontents=1

https://fr.wikipedia.org/wiki/Coupe_d%27Europe_des_clubs_de_basket-ball_en_fauteuil_roulant

https://fr.wikipedia.org/wiki/Championnat_d%27Europe_f%C3%A9minin_de_basket-ball_en_fauteuil_roulant_2021?tableofcontents=1

https://fr.wikipedia.org/wiki/Championnat_d%27Europe_masculin_de_basket-ball_en_fauteuil_roulant_2021

References

External links
 Official website of the International Wheelchair Basketball Federation - Europe
 https://iwbf.org/europe/

 
Wheelchair basketball competitions between national teams
Wheelchair basketball
Basketball competitions in Europe between national teams
Recurring sporting events established in 1970
1970 establishments in Europe